Platinum Hits is the first greatest hits album by American singer Jason Derulo, released on July 29, 2016, by Beluga Heights Records and Warner Bros. Records. The album contains 11 previously released singles from Jason Derulo (2010), Future History (2011), Tattoos (2013), Talk Dirty (2014) and Everything Is 4 (2015) along with a new song titled "Kiss the Sky" from the movie Storks (2016).

Background and release
The release of Platinum Hits was announced by Derulo on July 29, 2016. The compilation album consists of all of his singles which have been certified platinum or multi-platinum by RIAA.

Promotion
"Kiss the Sky" was released as promotional single from the album, and is also featured on the soundtrack of the 2016 animated film Storks.

Commercial performance
The album debuted at number 83 on the Billboard 200 with 7,000 equivalent album units, selling 2,000 copies in its first week.

Track listing

Personnel

 Jason Derulo – lead vocals 
 2 Chainz – vocals 
 Snoop Dogg – vocals 
 J.R. Rotem – production 
 Ricky Reed – production 
 Ian Kirkpatrick – production 
 Axident – production 
 Honua Music – production 
 Jon Bellion – production 
 Fuego – production 
 Emanuel Kiriakou – production 
 Jonas Jeberg – production 
 Ammo – production 
 Heather Jeanette – production 
 Tim Roberts – production 
 The Fliptones – production 
 Thomas Troelsen – production 
 Thomas Eriksen – production 
 John Ryan – co-production 
 Joe London – co-production

Charts

Weekly charts

Year-end charts

Certifications

References

External links
 

2016 greatest hits albums
Jason Derulo albums